Ismaël Eragae Alassane (born 3 April 1984) is a Nigerien footballer. He plays as a centre back.

Career
The defender has played for JS du Ténéré, Sahel SC ASFA Yennega and Enyimba International F.C.

While playing for ASFA Yennega, Alassane scored a penalty as the club lost in the 2007 CAF Champions League preliminary round.

International career
He was a member of the Niger national football team.

References 

1984 births
Living people
Nigerien footballers
Niger international footballers
Association football defenders
Enyimba F.C. players
Expatriate footballers in Burkina Faso
Expatriate footballers in Nigeria
ASFA Yennenga players
Nigerien expatriate sportspeople in Burkina Faso
Sahel SC players
Nigerien expatriate sportspeople in Nigeria
2013 Africa Cup of Nations players
Al-Sahel SC (Kuwait) players
AS Mangasport players
Nigerien expatriate sportspeople in Kuwait
Nigerien expatriate sportspeople in Gabon
Nigerien expatriate sportspeople in Bahrain
Busaiteen Club players
Expatriate footballers in Kuwait
Kuwait Premier League players
Expatriate footballers in Bahrain
Expatriate footballers in Gabon